This is a list of singles that charted in the top ten of the ARIA Charts in 2006.

Top-ten singles

Key

2005 peaks

2007 peaks

Entries by artist
The following table shows artists who achieved two or more top 10 entries in 2006, including songs that reached their peak in 2005 and 2007. The figures include both main artists and featured artists. The total number of weeks an artist spent in the top ten in 2006 is also shown.

References 

Top 10 singles
Australia Top 10 singles
Top 10 singles 2006
Australia 2006